Elcom may refer to:

 Elcom Credit Union, a credit union in Australia
 Elcom Technology, software company
 Electricity Commission of New South Wales, a statutory body responsible for the generation and distribution of electricity in  New South Wales, Australia